
Gmina Kłodawa is an urban-rural gmina (administrative district) in Koło County, Greater Poland Voivodeship, in west-central Poland.

Villages
Apart from the town of Kłodawa, Gmina Kłodawa contains the villages and settlements of Bierzwienna Długa, Bierzwienna Długa-Kolonia, Bierzwienna Krótka, Cząstków, Dąbrówka, Dębina, Dzióbin, Głogowa, Górki, Janczewy, Kęcerzyn, Kobylata, Korzecznik, Krzykosy, Łążek, Leszcze, Łubno, Luboniek, Okoleniec, Podgajew, Pomarzany Fabryczne, Rgielew, Rycerzew, Rysiny, Rysiny-Kolonia, Słupeczka, Straszków, Tarnówka, Wólka Czepowa and Zbójno.

Neighbouring gminas
Gmina Kłodawa is bordered by the gminas of Babiak, Chodów, Grabów, Grzegorzew, Olszówka and Przedecz.

References
Polish official population figures 2006

Klodawa
Koło County